The 2017–18 Syracuse Orange men's basketball team represented Syracuse University during the 2017–18 NCAA Division I men's basketball season. The Orange were led by 42nd-year head coach Jim Boeheim and played their home games at the Carrier Dome in Syracuse, New York as fifth-year members of the Atlantic Coast Conference. They finished the season 23–14, 8–10 in ACC play to finish in a tie for tenth place. They defeated Wake Forest in the first round of the 2018 ACC tournament before losing in the second round to North Carolina. They received one of the final four at-large bids to the NCAA tournament where, as a No. 11 seed, they defeated Arizona State in the First Four, and upset No. 6 seed TCU in the First Round and No. 3 seed Michigan State in the Second Round before losing in the Sweet Sixteen to fellow ACC member and No. 2 seed Duke.

Previous season
The Orange finished the 2016–17 season 19–15, 10–8 in ACC play to finish in a three-way tie for seventh place. They lost in the second round of the ACC tournament to Miami. They were one of the last four teams not selected for the NCAA tournament and thus received a No. 1 seed in the National Invitation Tournament. There, they defeated UNC Greensboro in the first round before losing in the second round to Ole Miss.

Offseason

Departures

Incoming transfers

2017 recruiting class

Future recruits

2018 recruiting class

Roster

Schedule and results

|-
!colspan=12 style=| Exhibition

|-
!colspan=12 style=| Non-conference regular season

|-
!colspan=12 style=| ACC regular season

|-
!colspan=12 style=| ACC Tournament

|-
!colspan=12 style=| NCAA tournament

Rankings

*AP does not release post-NCAA Tournament rankings

References

Syracuse Orange men's basketball seasons
Syracuse
Syracuse
Syracuse basketball, men
Syracuse basketball, men